Somethingness is the ninth studio album by Canadian alternative rock band Our Lady Peace (OLP). Produced under Warner Music Records label by Jason Lader, who also produced their preceding album Curve, this is the band's first studio album in nearly six years and it was promoted using the PledgeMusic platform, a website which facilitates musicians reaching out to their fans to market and distribute music.

It is the first OLP album to have been released in two separate volumes; Vol. 1 was released as an EP in August 2017, and the remainder of the album (initially referred to as Vol. 2) was released on February 23, 2018, and contained all of the songs from Vol. 1. The album is the first not to feature original drummer Jeremy Taggart, who departed from the band in 2014, and is the first to feature Jason Pierce, who replaced Taggart in 2016.

Track listing
The official track listing includes the four songs initially released as part of Vol. 1, "Drop Me in the Water", "Hiding Place for Hearts", "Falling into Place", and "Nice to Meet You".

Personnel 
Information adapted from AllMusic credits listing database.
 Duncan Coutts – bass guitar, background vocals
 Raine Maida – vocals, lyricist
 Steve Mazur – guitar, background vocals
 Jason Pierce – drums, percussion
 Jason Lader – production, design, piano
 Spike Stent – mixing
 Brian Lucey – mastering

Charts

References 

2017 albums
2018 albums
Our Lady Peace albums
Self-released albums
Albums produced by Raine Maida